Pierre Jean-Jacques Gasly (born 7 February 1996) is a French racing driver currently competing in Formula One  under the French flag for Alpine. He won the 2016 GP2 Series championship, and finished as runner-up in the 2014 Formula Renault 3.5 Series and the 2017 Super Formula Championship. 

Gasly made his Formula One debut with Toro Rosso at the 2017 Malaysian Grand Prix. He moved to Red Bull Racing in 2019, before being demoted and replaced with Alexander Albon from Toro Rosso between the Hungarian and Belgian rounds to partner Daniil Kvyat. Regardless, Gasly achieved his first podium at the 2019 Brazilian Grand Prix, finishing second. He won at the 2020 Italian Grand Prix while driving for AlphaTauri, securing both his and the teams' maiden victory in Formula One. He would achieve another podium at the 2021 Azerbaijan Grand Prix by finishing third behind eventual race winner Sergio Pérez and Sebastian Vettel.

Gasly has moved to Alpine for the 2023 season. Gasly's first race for Alpine was the Bahrain Grand Prix on 5 March 2023 in which he finished ninth.

Personal life 
Gasly was born in Rouen, France, to father Jean-Jacques Gasly and mother Pascale. Gasly is the youngest of five and has four half brothers: two maternal from his mother's previous marriage, Nicolas Caron and Cyril Caron; and two paternal from his father's previous marriage, Phillipe Gasly and Paul Gasly. 

Gasly's family has long been involved in motorsports. His grandfather competed in karting, his grandmother a kart champion, and his father Jean Jacques has also competed in various categories of racing including karting, endurance racing and rallying. His father stopped rallying when he 'fell off [a] mountain' after his co-driver made a mistake reading the pace note. At the age of six, Gasly first experienced karting at a local karting track in Anneville-Ambourville. He was 13 years old when he left Rouen for Le Mans after his commitment for competitive racing.

Gasly grew up alongside Anthoine Hubert; karting with him since the age of seven, being educated at the same private school and having resided together as roommates for several years. He has been close friends with Charles Leclerc and Esteban Ocon since a young age. However, his relationship with Ocon deteriorated during their karting career. In 2019 he moved to Milan. Besides his native French, Gasly also speaks Italian and English.

Early career

Karting
Gasly entered competitive karting in 2006 at the age of ten, when he finished fifteenth in the French Minime Championship, before he finished fourth the following year. In 2008 he stepped up to the French Cadet Championship, before moving to the international scene in 2009. He moved into the KF3 category, staying until the end of 2010, when he finished as runner-up in the CIK-FIA European Championship.

Formula Renault

In 2011, Gasly made his début in single-seaters, taking part in the French F4 Championship 1.6-litre category. He finished third behind his future Eurocup rivals Matthieu Vaxivière and Andrea Pizzitola with seven podiums, including wins at Spa, Albi and Le Castellet.

Gasly moved to the 2-litre Formula Renault machinery in 2012, joining R-Ace GP in the Formula Renault Eurocup. He finished tenth with six point-scoring finishes, including podiums at Spa and the Nürburgring. He also had seven starts in the Formula Renault 2.0 Northern European Cup with the same team, taking a podium at the Nürburgring.

For 2013, Gasly moved to Tech 1 Racing. He took five podiums, as well as victories at Moscow, the Hungaroring and Le Castellet. He held an eleven-point lead over Oliver Rowland into the final meeting at Circuit de Barcelona-Catalunya, and ultimately clinched the title with third and sixth-place finishes; the latter result coming after a collision with Rowland, who received a drive-through penalty as a result.

The driver jumped to Formula Renault 3.5 Series in 2014, where he was hired by Arden under the Red Bull Junior Team development program. He finished the season as runner-up to another Red Bull Junior Carlos Sainz Jr., collecting eight podiums in the seventeen races.

GP2 Series

Gasly made his GP2 Series debut in 2014 at Monza circuit in support of Italian Grand Prix, replacing Caterham Racing driver Tom Dillmann who had commitments at other racing series and was unable to participate in GP2 Series races for that weekend. He then partook in post-season testing, driving for DAMS and signed with the French team to race alongside the British driver Alex Lynn, development driver of Williams F1 Team. Though taking three pole positions and four podiums, Gasly experienced an uneven season, including causing collisions in Bahrain, Spa and Yas Marina (which got the subsequent race cancelled), which saw him finish eighth, two places behind teammate Lynn.

Gasly would switch to newcomers Prema Powerteam alongside 2015 European Formula 3 runner-up and GP2 rookie Antonio Giovinazzi for 2016. He would go on to become the GP2 Series champion that season.

Japanese Super Formula

After his success in GP2, Gasly joined Team Mugen, partnering Naoki Yamamoto, to drive a Red Bull-sponsored Honda at the 2017 Super Formula Championship. He won two races in a row before his season was effectively cut short by the cancellation of the final round at Suzuka Circuit due to Typhoon Lan. Gasly finished second in the standings, half a point from clinching the championship.

Formula E

Gasly made a one-off Formula E appearance for Renault  where he replaced Sébastien Buemi for the 2017 New York ePrix, due to the latter's commitments to the World Endurance Championship. In the weekend's first race, Gasly recovered from the poor qualifying performance of 19th to finish seventh in his debut race. Gasly nearly finished on the podium in the second race, hitting the wall on the exit of the final corner while battling for third and limping across the finish line with major damage in fourth.

Formula One
In December 2013 it was announced that Gasly would be inducted into the Red Bull Junior Team for the 2014 Formula One season alongside future GP2 Series teammate Alex Lynn and future Scuderia Toro Rosso teammate Carlos Sainz Jr. Gasly's first experience in Formula One machinery came in May 2015 at the in-season test at the Circuit de Barcelona-Catalunya. He drove the Toro Rosso STR10 on the first day of the test and the Red Bull RB11 on the second day, recording 203 laps in total. He later tested the RB11 again at the Red Bull Ring in June and was officially named Red Bull Racing's reserve driver in September.

Toro Rosso (2017–2018) 
 Gasly made his Formula One race debut at the 2017 Malaysian Grand Prix with Toro Rosso, replacing Daniil Kvyat. He finished the Malaysian and Japanese Grands Prix outside the points. Gasly was expected to take Carlos Sainz Jr.'s seat at the  after Sainz left for Renault, but he was forced to miss the race due to a clash with the final round of the 2017 Super Formula Championship.

Gasly and Hartley became full-time Toro Rosso drivers for the  season. He finished the race in fourth place after Kimi Räikkönen retired, earning his first points finish in Formula One. He ended the season in fifteenth place in the championship with 29 points, comfortably ahead of Hartley's total of four points.

Red Bull (2019) 

Gasly was contracted to drive for Red Bull Racing for the  season, partnering Max Verstappen following the departure of Daniel Ricciardo to Renault. He scored points at the following six races but finished a lap behind the leaders at the Canadian, French and Austrian Grands Prix, the latter of which was won by Verstappen. His best result with Red Bull Racing came at the  where he finished fourth after Verstappen and Sebastian Vettel collided ahead.

Despite Gasly's poor results, Red Bull team principal Christian Horner and advisor Helmut Marko stated that the team intended to keep Gasly until the end of the season. At this stage of the season, Gasly was sixth in the drivers' championship with 63 points. Verstappen, meanwhile, had recorded 181 points, two race wins, five podium finishes, and one pole position.

Return to Toro Rosso (2019) 

Red Bull stated that the swap was made in order to "make an informed decision as to who will drive alongside Max [Verstappen] in 2020", with Horner remarking that "we desperately need [Gasly] realising more of the potential of the car."

This marked the first podium finish of Gasly's Formula One career, Toro Rosso's best race result since the 2008 Italian Grand Prix, and Honda's first 1–2 finish since the 1991 Japanese Grand Prix. On his cool-down lap, Gasly remarked over the radio: "This is the best day of my life". He ended the season seventh in the drivers' championship with 95 points.

AlphaTauri (2020–2022)

2020 

Gasly was retained by the team, along with Kvyat, as they rebranded to Scuderia AlphaTauri. Gasly achieved four points finishes in the first seven races of the season, with best results of seventh place at the Austrian and British Grands Prix.

As race leader Hamilton entered the pits to serve a penalty and second-placed driver Lance Stroll lost places at the restart, Gasly inherited the lead of the race and held off the late-charging Carlos Sainz Jr. to take his first win in Formula One, becoming the 109th different race winner and the first French driver to win a Grand Prix since Olivier Panis' victory at the 1996 Monaco Grand Prix, 24 years prior. This prompted speculation that Gasly could return to Red Bull, as his replacement, Alex Albon, finished only fifteenth. Gasly remarked that he was 'ready' to do so. AlphaTauri team principal Franz Tost praised Gasly's race but dismissed the possibility of Gasly returning to Red Bull in the near future.

He finished the 2020 season tenth in the drivers' championship with 75 points, ahead of teammate Kvyat's 32 points.

2021 

He qualified fifth for the season-opening  but collided with Daniel Ricciardo and later retired from the race. He qualified fourth, dropped to fifth early in the race, but benefited from a tyre failure for Max Verstappen and a mistake from Lewis Hamilton in the closing stages and prevailed in a battle with Charles Leclerc on the penultimate lap to finish third. Gasly's points streak ended at the  when he was eliminated by a first-lap collision with Leclerc. A late-race puncture at the  dropped Gasly out of the points positions. 

He retired from the race on lap four due to damaged suspension. He finished sixth at the  despite a penalty for causing a collision with Fernando Alonso. Gasly started on the front row for the first time at the  but finished the race outside the points. Gasly finished the season ninth in the drivers' standings with 110 of AlphaTauri's 142 points, his highest ever points tally in a single season.

2022 

Gasly continued to race for AlphaTauri in  alongside Tsunoda. An engine fire caused his retirement from the season-opening . Gasly qualified tenth at the  but collided with Lewis Hamilton in the sprint and Sebastian Vettel in the race, finishing fifteenth.

He recovered to the points positions, finishing ninth. His final points of the season came at the Italian and Singapore Grands Prix. Gasly had ran in seventh place in Singapore, but complained that the team "threw away" this result by switching him to dry-weather tyres too early, dropping him to tenth. He received a penalty for speeding under the subsequent red flag and was demoted to eighteenth place. Gasly ended the season fourteenth in the drivers' championship, scoring 23 points to Tsunoda's 12.

In August and September, information emerged that Alpine were targeting Gasly after Fernando Alonso and Oscar Piastri both left the team, and that Red Bull were willing to release him. Gasly's move to Alpine for 2023 was officially announced in October.

Alpine (2023–)

2023 
Gasly signed a multi-year contract to race for Alpine in 2023, partnering fellow French former karting rival Esteban Ocon. AlphaTauri allowed Gasly to join Alpine for the post-season testing immediately after the 2022 Abu Dhabi Grand Prix.

Karting record

Karting career summary

Racing record

Racing career summary 

 Season still in progress.

Complete Formula Renault 3.5 Series results
(key) (Races in bold indicate pole position) (Races in italics indicate fastest lap)

Complete GP2 Series results
(key) (Races in bold indicate pole position) (Races in italics indicate fastest lap)

Complete Formula E results
(key) (Races in bold indicate pole position; races in italics indicate fastest lap)

Complete Super Formula results
(key) (Races in bold indicate pole position) (Races in italics indicate fastest lap)

Complete Formula One results
(key) (Races in bold indicate pole position; races in italics indicates fastest lap)

 Did not finish, but was classified as he had completed more than 90% of the race distance.
 Half points awarded as less than 75% of race distance was completed.
 Season still in progress.

References

External links

  
 

1996 births
Living people
Sportspeople from Rouen
French racing drivers
French F4 Championship drivers
Formula One race winners
Formula Renault 2.0 NEC drivers
Formula Renault Eurocup drivers
Formula Renault 2.0 Alps drivers
World Series Formula V8 3.5 drivers
GP2 Series drivers
GP2 Series Champions
Super Formula drivers
Formula E drivers
French Formula One drivers
Toro Rosso Formula One drivers
Red Bull Formula One drivers
AlphaTauri Formula One drivers
Alpine Formula One drivers
Twitch (service) streamers
R-ace GP drivers
Tech 1 Racing drivers
Arden International drivers
DAMS drivers
Prema Powerteam drivers
Mugen Motorsports drivers
Auto Sport Academy drivers
Caterham Racing drivers
Karting World Championship drivers
French expatriate sportspeople in Italy